Sex hormone-binding globulin (SHBG) or sex steroid-binding globulin (SSBG) is a glycoprotein that binds to androgens and estrogens. When produced by the Sertoli cells in the seminiferous tubules of the testis, it is called androgen-binding protein (ABP).

Other steroid hormones such as progesterone, cortisol, and other corticosteroids are bound by transcortin. SHBG is found in all vertebrates apart from birds.

Function
Testosterone and estradiol circulate in the bloodstream, loosely bound mostly to serum albumin (~54%), and to a lesser extent bound tightly to SHBG (~44%). Only a very small fraction of about 1 to 2% is unbound, or "free," and thus biologically active and able to enter a cell and activate its receptor. SHBG inhibits the function of these hormones. Thus, the local bioavailability of sex hormones is influenced by the level of SHBG. Because SHBG binds to testosterone (T) and dihydrotestosterone (DHT), these hormones are made less lipophilic and become concentrated within the luminal fluid of the seminiferous tubules. The higher levels of these hormones enable spermatogenesis in the seminiferous tubules and sperm maturation in the epididymis. SHBG’s production is regulated under the influence of FSH on Sertoli cells, enhanced by insulin, retinol, and testosterone.

The relative binding affinity of various sex steroids for SHBG is dihydrotestosterone (DHT) > testosterone > androstenediol > estradiol > estrone. DHT binds to SHBG with about 5 times the affinity of testosterone and about 20 times the affinity of estradiol. Dehydroepiandrosterone (DHEA) is weakly bound to SHBG, but dehydroepiandrosterone sulfate is not bound to SHBG. Androstenedione is not bound to SHBG either, and is instead bound solely to albumin. Estrone sulfate and estriol are also poorly bound by SHBG. Less than 1% of progesterone is bound to SHBG.

SHBG levels are usually about twice as high in women than in men. In women, SHBG serves to limit exposure to both androgens and estrogens. Low SHBG levels in women have been associated with hyperandrogenism and endometrial cancer due to heightened exposure to androgens and estrogens, respectively. During pregnancy, due to activation of SHBG production in the liver by high estrogen levels, SHBG levels increase by five-fold to ten-fold. The high SHBG levels during pregnancy may serve to protect the mother from exposure to fetal androgens that escape metabolism by the placenta. A case report of severe hyperandrogenism in a pregnant woman due to a rare instance of genetic SHBG deficiency illustrates this.

Biochemistry

Biosynthesis
SHBG is produced mostly by the liver and is released into the bloodstream. Other sites that produce SHBG include the brain, uterus, testes, and placenta. Testes-produced SHBG is called androgen-binding protein.

Gene
The gene for SHBG is called Shbg located on chromosome 17 on the short arm between the bands 17p12→p13. Overlapping on the complementary DNA strand is the gene for spermidine/spermine N1-acetyltransferase family member 2 (SAT2). Nearby are the genes for p53 and ATP1B2, and fragile X mental retardation, autosomal homolog 2 (FXR2) on the complementary strand. There are eight exons, of which exon 1 has three variations called 1L, 1T and 1N which are triggered by three promoters: PL, PT and PN respectively.  SHBG comes with the 1L, 2, 3, 4, 5, 6, 7, and 8 exons connected together.  A variation includes SHBG-T which is missing exon 7 but with exon 1T promoted by promoter PT on the opposite strand, which shared with that for SAT2.

Polymorphisms
There are variations in the genetic material for this protein that have different effects.
In humans common polymorphisms include the following:

Rs6259, also called Asp327Asn location 7633209 on Chromosome 17, results in there being an extra N-glycosilation site, and so an extra sugar can be attached.  This results in a longer circulation half-life for the protein, and raised levels.  A health effect is a lowered risk of endometrial cancer, and another is an increased risk of systemic lupus erythematosus.

Rs6258 also called Ser156Pro is at position 7631360 on the Chromosome 17.

Rs727428 position 7634474 is in several percent of humans.

(TAAAA)(n) is five base pairs that repeats a variable number of times on the opposite DNA strand.

Promoter activation
The mechanism of activating the promoter for SHBG in the liver involves hepatocyte nuclear factor 4 alpha (HNF4A) binding to a DR1 like cis element which then stimulate production.  Competing with HNF4A at a third site on the promoter is PPARG-2 which reduces copying the gene to RNA. If HNF4A level is low then COUP-TF binds to the first site and turns off production of SHBG.

Protein
Sex hormone-binding globulin is homodimeric, meaning it has two identical peptide chains making up its structure.  The amino acid sequence is the same as for androgen-binding protein but that has different oligosaccharides attached and is produced in testes.

SHBG has two laminin G-like domains which form pockets that bind hydrophobic molecules.  The steroids are bound by the LG domain at the amino end of the protein. Inside the pocket of the domain is a serine residue that attracts the two different types of steroids at different points, thus changing their orientation. Androgens bind at the C3 functional groups on the A ring, and estrogens bind via a hydroxyl attached to C17 on the D ring.  The two different orientations change a loop over the entrance to the pocket and the position of trp84 (in humans).  Thus the whole protein signals what hormone it carries on its own surface. The steroid binding LG domain is coded by exons 2 to 5.  A linker region joins the two LG domains together.

When first produced the SHBG precursor has a leading signal peptide attached with 29 amino acids. The remaining peptide has 373 amino acids. There are two sulfur bridges.

The sugars are attached at two different N-glycosylation points on asparagine (351 and 367)  and one O-glycosylation (7) point on threonine.

Metals
A calcium ion is needed to link the two elements of the dimer together. Also a zinc ion is used to orient an otherwise disorganised part of the peptide chain.

Regulation
SHBG has both enhancing and inhibiting hormonal influences thus can be viewed as a hepatokine. It decreases with high levels of insulin, growth hormone, insulin-like growth factor 1 (IGF-1), androgens, prolactin and transcortin. High estrogen and thyroxine levels cause it to increase.

In an effort to explain obesity-related reductions in SHBG, recent evidence suggests sugar or monosaccharide-induced hepatic lipogenesis, hepatic lipids in general, and cytokines like TNF-alpha and Interleukin reduce SHBG, whereas insulin does not.  As an example anti-psoriatic drugs that inhibit TNF-alpha cause an increase in SHBG. The common downstream mechanism for all of these, including the effect of thyroid hormones was downregulation of HNF4, hepatocyte nuclear factor 4.

Blood values
Reference ranges for blood tests for SHBG have been developed:

Clinical significance

High or low levels

SHBG levels are decreased by androgens, administration of anabolic steroids, polycystic ovary syndrome, hypothyroidism, obesity, Cushing's syndrome, and acromegaly. Low SHBG levels increase the probability of Type 2 Diabetes.  SHBG levels increase with estrogenic states (oral contraceptives), pregnancy, hyperthyroidism, cirrhosis, anorexia nervosa, and certain drugs. Long-term calorie restriction of more than 50 percent (in rodents) increases SHBG, while lowering free and total testosterone and estradiol. DHEA-S, which lacks affinity for SHBG, is not affected by calorie restriction. Polycystic Ovarian Syndrome is associated with insulin resistance and excess insulin lowers SHBG, which increases free testosterone levels.

In the womb the human fetus has a low level of SHBG allowing increased activity of sex hormones. After birth, the SHBG level rises and remains at a high level throughout childhood. At puberty the SHBG level halves in girls and goes down to a quarter in boys. The change at puberty is triggered by growth hormone, and its pulsatility differs in boys and girls. In pregnant women in the third trimester of pregnancy the SHBG level escalates to five to ten times the usual level for a woman. A hypothesis is that this protects against the effect of hormone produced by the fetus.

Obese girls are more likely to have an early menarche due to lower levels of SHBG. Anorexia or a lean physique in women leads to higher SHBG levels, which in turn can lead to amenorrhea.

Type 2 diabetes
Reduced levels of SHBG and also certain polymorphisms of the SHBG gene are implicated in the development of insulin resistance and type 2 diabetes. Such effects apparently involve direct action at the cellular level where it became apparent that cell membranes of certain tissues contain specific high-affinity SHBG receptors.

Coagulation
SHBG is a useful correlate and indirect marker of estrogen-induced procoagulation and by extension thrombosis, for instance with birth control pills.

Medications
Oral contraceptives containing ethinylestradiol can increase SHBG levels by 2- to 4-fold and decrease free testosterone concentrations by 40 to 80% in women. They can be used to treat symptoms of hyperandrogenism like acne and hirsutism. Some oral contraceptives, namely those containing high doses of ethinylestradiol (which have been discontinued and are no longer marketed), can increase SHBG levels by as much as 5- to 10-fold.

Some medications, such as certain anabolic steroids like mesterolone and danazol and certain progestins like levonorgestrel and norethisterone, have high affinity for SHBG and can bind to it and displace endogenous steroids from it, thereby increasing free concentrations of these endogenous steroids. It has been estimated that therapeutic levels of danazol, methyltestosterone, fluoxymesterone, levonorgestrel, and norethisterone would respectively occupy or displace from testosterone 83–97%, 48–69%, 42–64%, 16–47%, and 4–39% of SHBG binding sites, while others with low affinity for SHBG such as ethinylestradiol, cyproterone acetate, and medroxyprogesterone acetate would occupy or displace from testosterone 1% or fewer SHBG binding sites.

Endogenous steroids

Measurement
When checking serum estradiol or testosterone, a total level that includes free and bound fractions can be assayed, or the free portion may be measured alone. Sex hormone-binding globulin can be measured separately from the total fraction of testosterone.

A free androgen index expresses the ratio of testosterone to SHBG and can be used to summarize the activity of free testosterone.

Affinity and binding

Synonyms
SHBG has been known under a variety of different names including:

 Sex hormone-binding globulin (SHBG)
 Sex steroid-binding globulin (SSBG, SBG)
 Sex steroid-binding protein (SBP, SSBP)
 Androgen-binding protein (ABP)
 Estradiol-binding-protein (EBP)
 Testosterone–estradiol binding globulin (TeBG, TEBG)

References

Further reading

External links 
 
 
 

Glycoproteins